Pennsylvania Route 146 (PA 146) is a  state highway located entirely within McKean County in the U.S. state of Pennsylvania. The western terminus of the route is at U.S. Route 6 in the Hamlin Township community of Marvindale. The eastern terminus is at Pennsylvania Route 46 south of Colegrove in Norwich Township.

Route description

PA 146 begins at an intersection with US 6 in the community of Marvindale in Hamlin Township, heading southeast on two-lane undivided Clermont Road. The road passes farm fields before heading into forested areas. The route crosses into Sergeant Township and becomes Red Mill Brook Road, continuing through woodland with a few patches of farms and rural homes. PA 146 makes a turn to the northeast to remain along Red Mill Brook Road as it continues through forests. The road curves to the east and enters Norwich Township. Here, the route heads into a mix of rural farms and residences, briefly turning south before turning east onto Berts Crossing. PA 146 continues past more farmland, crossing the Potato Creek before ending at PA 46.

Major intersections

PA 146 Truck

Pennsylvania Route 146 Truck is a truck route that bypasses PA 146 altogether, which prohibits trucks over 10 tons from traveling on the route.  PA 146 also features a narrow bridge over the Potato Creek just west of its junction with PA 46.  Because of these truck hazards along PA 146, a truck route was established in 2013 along US 6 and PA 46.

See also

References

External links

Pennsylvania Highways: PA 146

146
Transportation in McKean County, Pennsylvania